The US Post Office—Whitinsville Main is an historic post office building located at 58 Church Street in the village of Whitinsville in the town of Northbridge, Massachusetts.  It is a single-story Colonial Revival masonry building, built of brick and cast stone and capped by a hip roof.  It was built in 1938, and is distinguished for the massive pilasters that flank the central entrance, and for its cupola.

The building was listed on the National Register of Historic Places in 1987, and was included in the Whitinsville Historic District in 1983.

See also 

National Register of Historic Places listings in Worcester County, Massachusetts
List of United States post offices

References 

Whitinsville
Buildings and structures in Northbridge, Massachusetts
National Register of Historic Places in Worcester County, Massachusetts
Historic district contributing properties in Massachusetts